Jammal Shahin (born 19 December 1988) is an English former footballer who played as a midfielder.

Shahin notably played in the Football League as a professional for Grimsby Town during the 2009–19
season. He then went on to play Non-league football for Armthorpe Welfare, Selby Town, Cleethorpes Town, Spalding United, Brigg Town and Grimsby Borough.

Early life
Jammal Shahin was born on 19 December 1988 in Grimsby, Lincolnshire.

Career
Shahin came through the youth ranks at Grimsby Town, and notably scored the winning goal in the clubs' 1–0 Midlands Floodlit Youth Cup final victory over Walsall in 2006. Shahin was a regular in Neil Woods side but in 2007 he was snubbed a professional contract and therefore was released. He went on to sign for Yorkshire semi professional side Armthorpe Welfare and later played as an amateur in the Grimsby League's for Lincs International FC and A & G Auto Repairs FC.

In September 2009, his former Grimsby youth coach Neil Woods recommended him to first-team manager Mike Newell, who after offering Shahin a trial would go on to sign the player on a contract until the end of the 2009–10 season. Shahin made his professional debut on 17 October, in a 2–0 home defeat against Rochdale. He would go on to make 7 appearances in all competitions for Grimsby, notably playing in the 3–1 Football League Trophy quarter-final defeat against Leeds United. He was never once on the winning side, playing out 2 draws and 5 defeats and was part of the Mariners side that was relegated from the Football League.

Shahin was released by Grimsby on 12 May 2010. In August 2010, he signed for non-League side Selby Town.

In November 2010, he joined Cleethorpes Town and later played for Spalding United and Brigg Town before returning to Selby Town. He signed for Grimsby Borough in 2012 and again in 2017.

References

External links

1988 births
Living people
Footballers from Grimsby
English footballers
Association football midfielders
Grimsby Town F.C. players
Armthorpe Welfare F.C. players
Selby Town F.C. players
Cleethorpes Town F.C. players
Spalding United F.C. players
Brigg Town F.C. players
Grimsby Borough F.C. players
English Football League players